Patiwat Khammai (born 24 December 1994) is a Thai professional footballer who plays as a goalkeeper for Thai League 1 club Muangthong United, on loan from Bangkok United, and the Thailand national team.

International career
On 12 April 2021, He was named in manager Akira Nishino’s 47-man squad for Thailand’s 2022 World Cup qualification he play the friendly matches against Tajikistan.

References

External links
 

1994 births
Living people
Patiwat Khammai
Patiwat Khammai
Patiwat Khammai
Association football goalkeepers
Patiwat Khammai
Patiwat Khammai
Patiwat Khammai
Patiwat Khammai
Patiwat Khammai